The 1988–89 Yugoslav First League season was the 43rd season of the First Federal League, the top level association football competition of SFR Yugoslavia, since its establishment in 1946.

The season began on 6 August 1988 with its fall part completing on 18 December 1988. Following a two-month winter break, the season resumed on 26 February 1989 and ran until 4 June 1989.

New rule: "Šajber's penalties"
The season saw the introduction of a new way of awarding points when a league match ends in a draw. Two points were still being awarded for a win, while in case of a draw at the end of the ninety minutes — penalty kicks were taken and the shootout winner was awarded one point while the loser got nothing. The 1988-89 season was the very first to feature this tie-break method, and the Yugoslav FA's decision to implement it caused a lot of criticism and controversy. The biggest proponent of the new rule was the Yugoslav FA (FSJ) president Slavko Šajber and it was often derisively referred to in the media as 'Šajber's penalties'.

League table

Results 
Results in brackets indicate the results from penalty shoot-outs whenever games were drawn.

Winning squad

Top scorers

See also
1988–89 Yugoslav Second League
1988–89 Yugoslav Cup

External links
Yugoslavia Domestic Football Full Tables

Yugoslav First League seasons
Yugo
1988–89 in Yugoslav football